KGWY (100.7 FM) is a radio station broadcasting a country music format. Licensed to Gillette, Wyoming, United States, the station is currently owned by Basin Radio Network, a division of Legend Communications of Wyoming, LLC.

KGWY and its three sister stations, KIML, KAML-FM, and KDDV are located at 2810 Southern Drive, Gillette. The KGWY transmitter site is on Rain Dancer Court, close to the radio studios.

History
The station was assigned the call sign KGWY on January 18, 1983, as Y-100, a Top-40 station.

References

External links

Country radio stations in the United States
GWY
Radio stations established in 1983